Barry Christopher Paul (born 10 May 1948) is a retired British international fencer.

Fencing career
He competed in the individual and team foil events at the 1972 and 1976 Summer Olympics. He represented England and won a gold medal in the team foil and a silver medal in the individual foil, at the 1970 British Commonwealth Games in Edinburgh, Scotland.

He was a five times British fencing champion, winning five foil titles at the British Fencing Championships, from 1974 to 1980.

Personal life
He is part of a famous fencing and athletics family; his parents were René Paul and June Foulds, his brother is Graham Paul, his uncle was Raymond Paul and his cousin is Steven Paul.

References

1948 births
Living people
British male fencers
Olympic fencers of Great Britain
Fencers at the 1972 Summer Olympics
Fencers at the 1976 Summer Olympics
People from Bethnal Green
Sportspeople from London
Commonwealth Games medallists in fencing
Commonwealth Games gold medallists for England
Commonwealth Games silver medallists for England
Fencers at the 1970 British Commonwealth Games
Medallists at the 1970 British Commonwealth Games